The Rainey House is a one-and-a-half-story brick home in Franklin, Tennessee that dates from 1839. It was built in the original 15 blocks of the city of Franklin and was standing during the American Civil War Battle of Franklin. Like many structures
standing at the time, it was used as a field hospital during and after the battle.

It was listed on the National Register of Historic Places in 1970. The house is listed as being one of the least-altered historic properties in Franklin.  It was originally built by Robert Rainey who operated a store across the street from the City of Franklin Railroad Depot.  While the depot is no longer in service, the train line across the street from the house is still active. 

A bridge across the Harpeth River located on the other side of the railroad tracks from the house leads to Pinkerton Park where there is a short hike up to Fort Granger, a Union Fort used during the Civil War.

It has also been known as The Bob Rainey House.

The house has Greek Revival details.

References

Houses on the National Register of Historic Places in Tennessee
Houses in Franklin, Tennessee
Houses completed in 1839
National Register of Historic Places in Williamson County, Tennessee